Artur Noga (born 2 May 1988 in Racibórz) is a Polish athlete. He mainly competes in the 110 metres hurdles. He finished 5th at the 2008 Summer Olympics in a time of 13.36s.

In 2006, he won a gold medal at the World Junior Championships in Beijing at 110 metres hurdles. His winning time of 13.26s was a Championship record.

His 110 metres hurdles personal best of 13.26, set in 2013, is the standing national record.

Achievements

Personal bests

Competition record

References

1988 births
Living people
People from Racibórz
Sportspeople from Silesian Voivodeship
Polish male hurdlers
Olympic male hurdlers
Olympic athletes of Poland
Athletes (track and field) at the 2008 Summer Olympics
Athletes (track and field) at the 2012 Summer Olympics
World Athletics Championships athletes for Poland
European Athletics Championships medalists
European Games competitors for Poland
Athletes (track and field) at the 2019 European Games
21st-century Polish people